Pühajõe is a village in Toila Parish, Ida-Viru County in northeastern Estonia.

References
 

Villages in Ida-Viru County